"The Bitchelor", stylized with the "i" as an eggplant emoji, is the third episode of the third season of the American drag queen-focused reality competition television series RuPaul's Drag Race All Stars, which aired on VH1 February 8, 2018. The season's eight remaining contestants impersonate stereotyped characters on a The Bachelor-style improvisation acting challenge. Constance Zimmer and Jeffrey Bowyer-Chapman, both from Unreal, itself a parody of The Bachelor-type shows, serve as guest judges, alongside regular panelists RuPaul, Michelle Visage, and Ross Mathews. Like the rest of the season, the show has a themed fashion runway challenge, and the contestants get feedback on both challenges. The top two queens vie in a lip sync battle with the winner choosing which contestant is eliminated.

Episode

As the episode starts, the contestants, as usual, are shown recovering from the events that just transpired in the previous episode—including the review of the "lipstick mirror message", written by last episode's eliminated queen—in real time within the last two days. W magazine notes the series excels when it embraces the diversity of drag cultures, and cites this episode's tension between traditional Southern pageant queen Kennedy Davenport who some felt came off as bitter at times, and younger Club kid New York high-fashion, and seemingly entitled, elitist Milk. The latter "savagely" saying "she would send Kennedy home, because her drag is apparently not groundbreaking". Junkee noted that unlike Milk, prior to being on the show Davenport was a professional drag queen who "stakes her entire career on her work ethic, and ... [did not] necessarily have the luxury of experimenting and taking drag ‘to the next level’".

The eight remaining queens are introduced to the maxi-challenge by RuPaul, "playing the best version of Chris Harrison" from The Bachelor, who then assigned them personality trait roles, and a series of unscripted scenes, to impersonate in an improvisational theatre challenge based on The Bachelor. Prior to the season contestants are given a list of pop culture references they might want to check out, but not told the reason for each item; The Bachelor was on this season's list. It will test who has strong skills in the underlying abilities to do improv and can they embody and hold onto a character for a scene. According to The New York Times their "goal was not to win [the batchelor’s] heart but rather to see who could perform — satirize, really — stereotypes of femininity with enough humor to impress the judges". The improv challenge has become somewhat of a mainstay of the seasons with "The Bossy Rossy Show", "L.A.D.P. (Los Angeles Drag Patrol) based on Cops, 9021-Ho based on 90210, and "She-MZ" parodying TMZ as examples.

First, in the improv challenge with Jeffrey Bowyer-Chapman—who would later serve as a guest judge in the episode, and starting in the premiere season in 2020, as a regular judge on Canada's Drag Race—each queen came out of a limousine and did a short introduction scene outside of The Bitchelor house emulating the entrances made on The Batchelor/The Bachelorette franchise. Next, in pairs—as a thruple with Bowyer-Chapman, they took part in a date. Aja played a "Super Needy Girl", paired with Kennedy Davenport portraying a "Party Girl"; Milk impersonated a "Psycho Stalker", paired with Trixie Mattel as a "Fake Bitch"; BenDeLaCreme portrayed a "Cougar", paired with Bebe Zahara Benet playing a "Shy Virgin"; Chi Chi DeVayne and Shangela impersonated a "Polyamerous Lesbian couple".

Bowyer-Chapman in the end had to choose who he would give his "eggplant" (The Bitchelor version of The Batchelor’s rose ceremony) to; he looked at RuPaul who had peppered the scenes with looks of longing at the focus of all the queens. As the ceremony was about to begin RuPaul whispered something to Bowyer-Chapman, "and in one smooth sweep, [he swept 6 foot, 4 inch RuPaul in his arms] and strolled away. The departure sent the queens into a choreographed frenzy." Bowyer-Chapman felt the scene "was cutting commentary on both the racial discrimination of The Bachelor, which has never had an African-American star, and the way television warps people. The contestants [becoming] caricatures of themselves". Under public pressure for racial diversity, as well as a class action lawsuit, The Bachelor introduced its first Black star in its 18-year history, Matt James, in June 2020. In a further parody of the show, RuPaul filmed a confessional talk about her and Bowyer-Chapman, "[we will] do Good Morning America, then appear on Dancing with the Stars, and then "we'll get divorced" ... because that's what real life Bachelor winners do."

Runway
RuPaul introduces guest judges Bowyer-Chapman and Constance Zimmer, and shares the theme for the runway: "Wigs on Wigs on Wigs", inspired by Roxxxy Andrews’ reveal of a different wig after she removed the first. The challenge has each contestant to incorporate one or two wig reveals—a Ruveal—into their runway looks. The Culturess states, "The runway is delightful from beginning to end." Although all the queens were good, a standout was Aja's Kawaii Superstar into an anime lush Sailor Moon. The judges felt it was her best look ever, and it was designed by BCalla in collaboration with ISLYNYC and Dick and Virgil.

Upon judgement, BeBe Zahara Benet, and Shangela are deemed safe. During the critiques, BenDaLeCreme, Kennedy and Trixie receive positive feedback on their performances and runway looks, with BenDaLeCreme and Kennedy winning the challenge. Chi Chi DeVayne, Aja and Milk are all criticized for their performances and all are put up for elimination. The A.V. Club felt Davenport, as one of the queens who may decide the fate of the bottom three, wasted a reality-TV opportunity by not getting more air time meeting each of the three because she had already made up her mind.

Lip Sync
W magazine felt that neither queen, Kennedy Davenport, or BenDeLa Creme, "found a way to satisfyingly connect" with their lip sync of Lorde’s 2017 single "Green Light". Creme "sort of got lost in the riddle of Lorde without finding a satisfying answer", while Kennedy channelled the "most serious of Diana Ross's ballad". Paper felt the issue was with the producers’ choice as "Green Light" is "not a lip sync for your legacy song". Towleroad echoed that sentiment noting "Ballads rarely make compelling lip syncs". Vulture disagreed noting "BenDeLa’s interpretation is less layered in comparison to the full-diva gravitas Kennedy brings to the song while honoring its gradual buildup to the chorus. The reveal of a second wig and a jewel-encrusted black dress under her robe is breathtaking, and Kennedy easily nabs the win for an all-around amazing lip-sync performance"; she holds the lipstick of the episode's loser. Milk ended up being eliminated when Davenport won the battle and the $10,000 cash tip. Billboard felt Chi Chi should have been eliminated instead saying, "Milk and Chi Chi flopped ... but Milk’s failure was trying too hard at something that’s not natural for her, and Chi Chi’s failure was that she didn’t even try in the first place."

  The contestant was eliminated after their first time in the bottom.

Reception 
Gay Times felt the maxi-challenge was "comedy gold". W magazine thought this was the first time that improv skills had been so highlighted in the series. The Independent characterized it as "a challenge which tottered between the extremes of misogynist media portrayals of women and riotously funny quick witted parodies of characters so far out you could feel the [Charisma, Uniqueness, Nerve, and Talent]." They went on to point out, "drag is about performing certain traits of femininity, but it can get super-uncomfortable when no questions are asked, when the butt of the joke is the woman and not stupid societal portrayals of femininity. When the jokes landed this week they were literally a laugh a minute, but when they flopped we didn’t even need the infamous cricket sound to amp up the awkward." The New York Times Magazine said it appreciated "the way that it slyly highlighted how our culture coaxes us to treat finding love as a competition". The A.V. Club felt The Bitchelor should get its own television series with the "dreamy" Bowyer-Chapman reprising his role. They felt "This is the most difficult challenge yet because funny improv is hard, but it allows the best All Stars to show off their talent and their personality by performing on the fly."

Towleroad felt that Aja successfully carried out her vision for her character, but that the vision was wrong. Aja was supposed to channel "needy" but kept inventing non-related backstories. Jezebel’s reviewer felt Davenport’s portrayal in the Bitchelor was "perhaps the funniest performance in an acting challenge [in the series] to date—second only to Ginger Minj’s star turn with Trixie Mattel in Season 7's John Waters tribute", a Rusical about eating eggs. The A.V. Club stated, "Kennedy has an outrageous side that she reserves for these comedy challenges".

The A.V. Club thought BenDeLaCreme's "drunk cougar" had the best one-liners like "Have you ever taken out a catheter?", with "most involving creepy infantilization and suggestive bananaplay. Her comic timing is fantastic, and even though she has a massive personality, she doesn’t push her partner out of the scene." The New York Times seemed to agree saying BenDeLaCreme's "boozy matron, spilling a Cosmo and sliding along the side of her limo toward Mr. Bowyer-Chapman with her skirt hiked up and crotch pixelated, made me howl."

Vulture felt Milk "steamrolled" over Trixie and Bowyer-Chapman, yet lacked the self-awareness that her performance was subpar. Billboard felt she partly redeemed herself with possibly her best runway look to date.

Screen Rant felt the episode was the best show of the season with all the queens ultimately doing a good job.

Further reading

References

External links
 The Bitchelor at IMDb

2018 American television episodes
American LGBT-related television episodes
RuPaul's Drag Race All Stars episodes